In the 1988 Cannes and Nice attacks, neo-Nazis posing as Jewish extremists bombed Sonacotra immigrant hostels in 1988, killing one person and hurting sixteen.

Attacks
On 9 May 1988, a Sonacotra hostel in Cannes that was frequented by North African immigrants was bombed with a gas bottle, injuring four people.

On December 19 of the same year, 2 firebombs exploded in a hostel for immigrant workers from North Africa in Cagnes-sur-Mer, a suburb of Nice. In the subsequent panic as tenants evacuated, a third and probably murderous bomb exploded in one of the exits of the building. The attack injured twelve people and killed one. Although police spokesmen reported that most of the residents in the building in Cagnes-sur-Mer were Tunisian, the lone fatality was George Iordachescu, a Romanian exile.

Perpetrator
In an attempt to frame Jewish extremists for the Cagnes-sur-Mer bombing, the terrorists left anti-Islam leaflets bearing Stars of David and calling themselves the Masada Action and Defense Movement. It also contained the message "To destroy Israel, Islam has chosen the sword. For this choice, Islam will perish."

The Zionist moniker turned out to be a false flag, and in January 1989, 18 members of the neo-Nazi French and European Nationalist Party (PFNE) were arrested for the bombings, which had been intended to provoke tensions between Arabs and Jews in France. They were also suspected of another bombing attack in Paris against the offices of the Le Globe newspaper on 31 July 1988.

Four police officers from the Fédération professionnelle indépendante de la police (FPIP) union, Patrick Reynes, Daniel Lenoir, Philippe Caplain and Daniel Sirizzotti, were also charged with criminal conspiracy in 1990. They were also thought to have been members of the PNFE.

In 1991, Nicolas Gouge was sentenced to 18 years in prison, and his accomplices Philippe Lombardo, Georges Cassar and Serge Bayoni, were sentenced to 14, 12 and 8 years in prison respectively. The group's leader Gilbert Hervochon, was acquitted from a prison sentence but was sentenced on 15 October to four years in detention for criminal conspiracy.

See also
 List of right-wing terrorist attacks
False Flag

References

1988 in France
1988 murders in France
Improvised explosive device bombings in 1988
Anti-Muslim violence in Europe
Improvised explosive device bombings in France
Nationalist terrorism in Europe
False flag operations
Anti-Arabism in Europe
Neo-fascist terrorist incidents
Attacks on hotels in Europe
May 1988 events in Europe
December 1988 events in Europe
Terrorist incidents in France in 1988
Building bombings in France
Hotel bombings
Terrorist incidents in Provence-Alpes-Cote d'Azur
1980s building bombings